Hanns Elard Ludin (10 June 1905, in Freiburg – 9 December 1947, in Bratislava) was a German diplomat.

Born in Freiburg to Friedrich and Johanna Ludin, Ludin began his Nazi affiliation in 1930 by joining the party, and was arrested for his political activities the same year.  Imprisoned until 1931, he joined the SA on his release.

Ludin was lucky to survive the "Night of the Long Knives" in 1934 when Hitler purged much of the left-wing of the Nazi party.  Ludin restored his reputation by joining the Foreign Office and became Ambassador to the Slovak Republic in 1941, replacing Manfred von Killinger.

Ludin's activities included convincing the Slovak government to comply with deportations for slave labor and providing diplomatic cover to such activities.  In 1943, he was promoted to SA-Obergruppenführer.

Ludin was arrested after the war and extradited to Czechoslovakia, where he was tried with SS-Obergruppenführer Hermann Höfle (not to be confused with SS-Sturmbannführer Hermann Julius Höfle).  He was sentenced to death and was hanged on 9 December 1947.

Married to Erla von Jordan (1905 – 1997), Ludin had six children: Erika (1933 – 1997), Barbara (born 1935), Ellen (born 1937), Tilman (1939 – 1999), Malte (born 1942) and Andrea (born 1943).

Documentary film 
Hanns Ludin's youngest son, Malte Ludin, filmed a documentary about the impact of his father's involvement in the Third Reich on his family.  The film, 2 oder 3 Dinge, die ich von ihm weiß, had its initial release in 2005.  The movie's commercial run in New York City began on 24 January 2007 at the Film Forum.

1905 births
1947 deaths
People from Freiburg im Breisgau
People from the Grand Duchy of Baden
German Protestants
Nazi Party politicians
Members of the Reichstag of the Weimar Republic
Members of the Reichstag of Nazi Germany
Sturmabteilung officers
German expatriates in Slovakia
Holocaust perpetrators in Yugoslavia
Holocaust perpetrators in Slovakia
Slovakia during World War II
People extradited from Germany
People extradited to Czechoslovakia
Nazis executed by Czechoslovakia by hanging
Executed people from Baden-Württemberg
20th-century German diplomats